Pablo Andújar was the defending champion, but decided not to participate.
1st seed Filippo Volandri defeated Matteo Viola 4–6, 6–3, 6–2 in the final to win the tournament.

Seeds

Draw

Final four

Top half

Bottom half

References
 Main Draw
 Qualifying Draw

Orbetello Challenger - Singles
Orbetello Challenger